The 2022 European U20 Beach Volleyball Championships is a 2022 edition of European U20 Beach Volleyball Championships which is a unisex competition of national teams which took place from 14 to 17 July 2022 in İzmir in Turkey.

Schedule

Medal summary

Medal table

Men

Pool A

|}

Pool B

|}

Pool C

|}

Pool D

|}

Pool E

|}

Pool F

|}

Pool G

|}

Pool H

|}

Classification 25-29

|}

Classification 17-21

|}

Classification 9-13

|}

Classification 5-8

|}

Final bracket

Round of 24

|}

Round of 16

|}

Quarterfinals

|}

Semifinals

|}

Final 7th place

|}

Final 5th place

|}

Final 3rd place

|}

Final 1st place

|}

Final ranking

Women

Pool A

|}

Pool B

|}

Pool C

|}

Pool D

|}

Pool E

|}

Pool F

|}

Pool G

|}

Pool H

|}

Classification 25-29

|}

Classification 17-21

|}

Classification 9-13

|}

Classification 5-8

|}

Final bracket

Round of 24

|}

Round of 16

|}

Quarterfinals

|}

Semifinals

|}

Final 7th place

|}

Final 5th place

|}

Final 3rd place

|}

Final 1st place

|}

Final ranking

References

External links
CEV

European Beach Volleyball Championships
Sports competitions in Izmir
July 2022 sports events in Turkey
2020s in İzmir